Banking in the United Kingdom can be considered to have started in the Kingdom of England in the 17th century. The first activity in what later came to be known as banking was by goldsmiths who, after the dissolution of English monasteries by Henry VIII, began to accumulate significant stocks of gold.

17th century

Many goldsmiths were associated with The Crown but, following seizure of gold held at the Royal Mint in the Tower of London by Charles I, they extended their services to gentry and aristocracy as the Royal Mint was no longer considered a safe place to keep gold. Goldsmiths came to be known as ‘keepers of running cash’ and they accepted gold in exchange for a receipt as well as accepting written instructions to pay back, even to third parties. This instruction was the forerunner to the modern banknote or cheque. Around 1650, a cloth merchant, Thomas Smith opened the first provincial bank in Nottingham. During 1694 the Bank of England was founded.

The Governor and Company of the Bank of Scotland was established by an Act of the Parliament of Scotland on 17 July 1695, the Act for erecting a Bank in Scotland, opening for business in February 1696. Although established soon after the Bank of England, the Bank of Scotland was a very different institution. Where the Bank of England was established specifically to finance defence spending by the English government, the Bank of Scotland was established by the Scottish government to support Scottish business, and was prohibited from lending to the government without parliamentary approval. The founding Act granted the bank a monopoly on public banking in Scotland for 21 years, permitted the bank's directors to raise a nominal capital of £1,200,000 Pound Scots (£100,000 Pound Sterling), gave the Proprietors (shareholders) limited liability, and in the final clause (repealed only in 1920) made all foreign-born Proprietors naturalised Scotsmen "to all Intents and Purposes whatsoever". John Holland, an Englishman, was one of the bank's founders. Its first chief accountant was George Watson.

18th century

During this period, services offered by banks increased. Clearing facilities, security investments and overdraft protections were introduced. An Act of Parliament in 1708 restricted banks with more than six partners from issuing bank notes. This had the effect of keeping private banks as small partnerships.  Joint stock investment companies were already well established, but joint stock banks did not become well established until the following century.

The Industrial Revolution and growing international trade increased the number of banks, especially in London. These new "merchant banks" facilitated trade growth, profiting from England's emerging dominance in seaborne shipping. Two immigrant families, Rothschild and Baring, established merchant banking firms in London in the late 18th century and came to dominate world banking in the next century.

Many merchant banks were also established outside London, especially in growing industrial and port cities such as Manchester, Birmingham, Newcastle and Liverpool. By 1784, there were more than 100 provincial banks. The industrialist turned banker such as Fox, Fowler and Company could assist his own industry since he not only provided a local means of payment, but also accepted deposits.

A great impetus to country banking came in 1790 when, with England threatened by war, the Bank of England suspended cash payments. A handful of Frenchmen landed in Pembrokeshire, causing a panic. Shortly after this incident, Parliament authorised the Bank of England and country bankers to issue notes of low denomination.

19th century

On 23 October 1826 a new joint stock bank, Lancaster Banking Company, was formed. However earlier that year the Bristol Old bank had converted from a private to a joint stock bank, making it the first joint stock bank. This was quickly followed by other institutions such as the Manchester & Liverpool District Banking Company and the National Provincial Bank. The National Provincial was the first bank to be considered a truly national bank with twenty branches across England and Wales.

In 1844 the government introduced the Bank Charter Act to regulate the issuing of bank notes. Two banking collapses, one in 1866 and another in 1878 caused significant reputation damage but in consequence record keeping and accounting improved. The resulting new organisations became huge bureaucracies with a board of directors, general manager, secretary and an army of accounting clerks.

In 1896 twenty smaller private banks formed a new joint-stock bank. 
The leading partners of the new bank, which was named Barclay and Company, were already connected by a web of family, business and religious relationships. The company became known as the Quaker Bank, because this was the family tradition of the founding families.  This bank eventually became Barclays PLC.

20th century

Between the wars, there was a decline to match the general depression of the time. But the banks fought back by taking action to recruit less wealthy customers and by introducing small saving schemes.

It would take until 1950 for real recovery where there was a huge increase in provincial branch offices and the emergence of the high street bank. Relaxation of some controls over mergers and acquisitions led to consolidation in the 1960s in which the Big Five became the Big Four, along with the takeover of several regional banks (Martins, District Bank, National Bank, Glyn Mills and William Deacons). At the same time the government launched a new banking service, the National Girobank. In 1976 the Banking Act increased the supervisory role of the Bank of England.

Introduction of computing, credit cards and many new services continued to drive the expansion of banks and as deregulation was introduced competitiveness increased. Banks improved services, refurbished antiquated premises and brought in further technology such as ATM.

21st century
Currently most banks in the United Kingdom offer very similar services, distinguished only by differing interest rates.

In 2006, the Office of Fair Trading found that the banks were exploiting penalty bank charges on credit cards and has suggested that banks restrict such penalty to a maximum of £12. Penalty charges or Liquidated damages are illegal in UK contract law unless they represent the real cost of a breach of contract incurred through an unauthorised overdraft level or bounced cheque.

This ruling by the OFT had been taken by many customers to extend to their personal bank accounts and subsequently the UK small claims court system was flooded with cases of customers reclaiming these ‘illegal’ penalties. It was reported that nearly 1.8 million template letters to take the banks to court had been downloaded from the website MoneySavingExpert.com. In October 2009, the Supreme Court overturned previous rulings that allowed the OFT to investigate overdraft charges, bringing to an end such claims. Although initially the OFT said it would look at other ways to pursue the matter, in November that year it decided not to continue with further action.

Heads of major British banks met with the Governor of the Bank of England following days of market pressure on lenders' stocks. The Bank of England said after the 20 March 2008-meeting that participants had "agreed to continue their close dialogue with the objective of restoring more orderly market conditions."

As of 11 October 2008, the British banks have short-term liabilities equal to 156% of GDP or 368% of the British national debt, while the average leverage ratio (assets/net worth) is 24 to 1.

The Financial Services (Banking Reform) Act 2013 calls for a paradigmatic shift toward the principle adopted by the US of risk averse strategies. This manifests itself in the form of "ring-fencing" retail banking to protect consumers and creating requirements for certain amounts of capital to be retained to act as a buffer against market instability. This reform is set to support the strengthening economy and is a response to the Financial crisis of 2007–08.

Over the past 40 years (to 2014) the banking system in the UK experienced a 'dramatic shift' with total assets increasing from 100% of GDP to 450%, and it is 'plausible that the UK banking system will continue to grow rapidly', owing to its probable 'comparative advantage' in international banking services, with the pre-eminence of London as a financial centre.

As of Dec 2015, a number of new banking licences were secured, e.g. by Atom Bank and Tandem Bank.

In 2017, Business Insider came out with a list of the 18 most profitable banks in the United Kingdom while stating that the banks were now becoming profitable after facing challenges for the past few years. The top spot was grabbed by HSBC with an income of £5.49 billion followed by Lloyds with a profit of £4.04 billion.

Under a scheme launched in September 2021, 159 can be dialled by phone to contact a selection of banks directly. This has been implemented as a method of preventing financial scams.

See also

Credit unions in the United Kingdom
UK banking law
2008 United Kingdom bank rescue package
2009 United Kingdom bank rescue package
Banks of the United Kingdom
Banknotes of the pound sterling
Bank regulation
Banking Standards Board
Banking in the United States
British Bankers' Association
Financial institution
History of banking

References

Further reading
 Born, Karl Erich. International Banking in the 19th and 20th Centuries (St Martin's, 1983) online

 Lane, Nicholas. "The Fathers of English Banking" History Today (Mar 1953) 3#3 pp 190-199
 Michie, Ranald C. British Banking: Continuity and Change from 1694 to the Present (Oxford UP, 2016) 334 pp. online review
 Mottram, R. H. Bowler Hat: A Last Glance at the Old Country Banking (Hutchinson, 1940)

External links
 A history of English clearing banks